The 2016 CARIFTA Games took place between 26 and 28 March 2016. The event was held at the Grenada National Stadium in St. George's, Grenada.

Austin Sealy Award 
The Austin Sealy Trophy for the most outstanding athlete of the games was awarded to Anderson Peters of Grenada

Medal summary

Boys U-20 (Junior)

†: Open event for both junior and youth athletes.

Girls U-20 (Junior)

†: Open event for both junior and youth athletes.

Boys U-18 (Youth)

Girls U-18 (Youth)

References

External links
Official website (archived)
Results summary (archived)
Results by event

CARIFTA Games
CARIFTA Games
CARIFTA Games
CARIFTA Games
CARIFTA Games
CARIFTA Games
International sports competitions hosted by Grenada